Jamsikari is a village in Siwan district, in the Indian state of Bihar. According to the 2011 census of India, the population was 1,197 people (560 males; 637 females).

References

Villages in Siwan district